Daniel John-Jules (born 16 September 1960) is a British actor, singer and dancer. He is best known for playing Cat in the sci-fi comedy series Red Dwarf, Barrington in the comic children's series Maid Marian and Her Merry Men, and policeman Dwayne Myers in the crime drama Death in Paradise. He was also a protagonist in the hit CBBC children's spy drama M.I. High, in which he portrayed Lenny Bicknall, the caretaker.

Early life
John-Jules was born in St Mary's Hospital, Paddington, London, brought up in Notting Hill and attended Rutherford School, Paddington, from 1972 to 1977. There he learnt gymnastics.

Both his parents are from Dominica, and travelled to the UK from Dominica aboard the HMT Empire Windrush. His mother worked in the courts; he has a brother who is a barrister.

Career
John-Jules has played the role of Cat in the science fiction comedy series Red Dwarf since its inception in 1988. He also starred in the children's spy series M.I.High and played Barrington in the children's series Maid Marian and Her Merry Men. In addition to his acting career, he has made various appearances both as a dancer and a singer.

Before his television and film work, he was a dancer in a group called 'second generation' and in many productions in West End theatres. He was a member of the original cast of Starlight Express, playing a boxcar called Rocky I. In 1993, he released a song from Red Dwarf, "Tongue Tied", as a single, which entered the top 20, eventually reaching a high of 17. John-Jules featured his Red Dwarf co-stars and backing singers in the video. For this release, he was billed as simply "The Cat"; a CD-EP release was also issued featuring this song along with a version of the Red Dwarf theme song.

Among other productions, John-Jules was the dancer from the crowd in the Wham! video for "The Edge Of Heaven". He gets up partway through the instrumental section and dances alongside George Michael. John-Jules also danced on the Lena Zavaroni TV Series in 1981, and has made a tribute to her on her website.

On television, John-Jules is best known for his portrayal of Cat and Cat's geeky alter ego Dwayne Dibbley in the British comedy series Red Dwarf. He obtained the part of Cat by turning up half an hour late for his audition, dressed in his father's old zoot suit. He was unaware that he was late and hence did not appear at all concerned about it. The producers immediately decided he was cool enough to be "the Cat". Craig Charles said at a Red Dwarf convention that John-Jules was a lot like the Cat in that he had a lot of clothes. He said, "Danny John-Jules could change his clothes every four seconds for a year and he still wouldn't run out of clothes." Along with Charles, John-Jules is the only other cast member to appear in every episode of Red Dwarf to date.

His first acknowledged television and film roles were in Roy Minton's critically acclaimed Scum, where he played one of the inmates. The TV version, which was part of the Play for Today strand, was banned prior to broadcast.

He has also played the parts of Barrington in Maid Marian and her Merry Men, Byron Lucifer in The Tomorrow People and Milton Wordsworth, the original presenter of The Story Makers on CBeebies.

Since 1999, he has had several guest appearances as himself in shows such as Comedy Connections, RI:SE and Night Fever.

In 2002 he played Milton Wordsworth in the CBeebies series The Story Makers – an educational children's television programme that was broadcast between  2002 and 2004 that consisted of  4 series. He appears in every series except series 2.

He has also appeared in at least one episode of CBBC's sitcom Kerching!, playing Michael's father, Trevor and appeared as Lenny Bicknall in series 1 and 2 of M.I.High, also on CBBC. He has also appeared in The Crouches.

On 8 November 2009, he made a brief appearance during BBC Two's coverage of the 2009 Valencian Moto Grand Prix.

In 2014, he played Nigel Rogers in The Life of Rock with Brian Pern. In May 2015, it was announced that he would, again, be returning to Red Dwarf for the eleventh and twelfth series.

In 2004, Jules played a character on the SF comedy Starhyke, but the series remained in post-production for five years, being shown only privately in 2009, the rights finally being bought by Amazon.com in 2015 and released in 2016.

He appeared in the BBC One series Death in Paradise as policeman Dwayne Myers from its start until 2018. He returned as a guest star for the Death in Paradise Christmas Special in 2021.

It was announced that John-Jules plays the lead as Sir Leigh Teabing in the stage version of hit novel The Da Vinci Code's 2022 UK tour.

Film
John-Jules' film career began in 1975 playing Frog in the short film Seven Green Bottles, which was produced in conjunction with the Metropolitan Police and warned of the dangers and consequences of juvenile crime. He supplied the voice for two characters in Labyrinth (1986), then appeared in the 1986 version of Little Shop of Horrors, Lock, Stock and Two Smoking Barrels (1998), and Blade II (2002). He has also appeared, uncredited, in the 1979 British film Scum, playing a look-out during a fight scene.

He has appeared in the 2008 British films The Grind and Sucker Punch. He has a small role as Rachel Weisz' manager in the Lincoln, Nebraska police force in the 2010 film The Whistleblower.

John-Jules also played one of the dancers in the 1981 movie The Great Muppet Caper, which, like Little Shop Of Horrors, was directed by Frank Oz. He is among the dancers in the restaurant where Kermit and Miss Piggy are dancing.

Other work
John-Jules provided his voice for the character of Gex in the UK and European release of Gex 3: Deep Cover Gecko. For several years in the late 1990s he appeared in the annual Christmas pantomime at Aldershot's Princes Hall theatre, playing his Cat character. John-Jules has also provided voices for the British Canadian animated series Chop Socky Chooks for Cartoon Network, Teletoon and Aardman Animations and the 2015 remake of the British children's animated series Bob the Builder.

John-Jules participated in the 16th series of Strictly Come Dancing, partnered with professional dancer Amy Dowden. In week 5 he topped the leaderboard with a total of 37 points for his jive. The couple were awarded the first 10 score of the series when Darcey Bussell marked their Jive to "Flip, Flop and Fly" in week 5. The couple were eliminated in Week 8 after losing a dance off to Graeme Swann and Oti Mabuse, their elimination came days after controversial bullying allegations, with tabloids reporting that John-Jules had reduced Dowden to tears.

Personal life 
John-Jules is married to Petula Langlais; the couple have two children, both of whom have had minor acting roles alongside their father. He is also an avid motorcyclist and regularly participates in charity rides.

His nephew is Arsenal footballer Tyreece John-Jules.

In 2008, John-Jules was convicted of assaulting two bin men. He was ordered to perform 120 hours of community service as a punishment and to pay £350 costs and £75 compensation to each man. John-Jules did not accept the common assault convictions and said afterwards he had a "clear conscience".

Filmography

Film

Television

Video games

References

External links
 
 Danny John-Jules at the British Film Institute
 
 
 Danny John-Jules Interview at www.sci-fi-online.com

1960 births
Living people
English male film actors
English male television actors
English male voice actors
Black British male actors
Black British male comedians
Male actors from London
Musicians from London
English baritones
20th-century English male actors
21st-century English male actors
English people of Dominica descent
British male comedy actors
People from Paddington
English people convicted of assault